The 2019 Africa U-17 Cup of Nations qualification was a men's under-17 football competition which decided the participating teams of the 2019 Africa U-17 Cup of Nations.

Players born 1 January 2002 or later were eligible to participate in the competition. A total of eight teams qualified to play in the final tournament, including Tanzania who qualified automatically as hosts.

Teams
In July 2017, the Confederation of African Football decided that the qualifying competition should be split into regional competitions. To qualify, 49 of the 54 CAF members entered the qualifying tournament of their zone, including the hosts Tanzania, which also participated in qualification despite automatically qualified for the final tournament.

Apart from the hosts, each of the six zones received one spot in the final tournament, and the zone of the defending champions received an additional spot. Since Mali won the 2017 Africa U-17 Cup of Nations, West A Zone received two spots.

Notes
Teams in bold qualified for the final tournament.
(H): Qualifying tournament hosts
(Q): Automatically qualified for final tournament regardless of qualification results

Format
The qualification format is determined by each zone (Regulations Article 13).
In case any qualification ties are played on a home-and-away two-legged basis: If the aggregate score is tied after the second leg, the away goals rule is applied, and if still tied, the penalty shoot-out (no extra time) is used to determine the winner.
In case any qualification groups are played on a round-robin basis: Teams are ranked according to points (3 points for a win, 1 point for a draw, 0 points for a loss), and if tied on points, the following tiebreaking criteria are applied, in the order given, to determine the rankings:
Points in head-to-head matches among tied teams;
Goal difference in head-to-head matches among tied teams;
Goals scored in head-to-head matches among tied teams;
If more than two teams are tied, and after applying all head-to-head criteria above, a subset of teams are still tied, all head-to-head criteria above are reapplied exclusively to this subset of teams;
Goal difference in all group matches;
Goals scored in all group matches;
Drawing of lots.
In case any qualification matches are played on a knockout basis: The penalty shoot-out (no extra time) is used to decide the winner if necessary.

Schedule
The schedule of each qualifying zone is as follows.

North Zone

Tunisia hosted the 2018 UNAF U-17 Tournament, the 15th edition of the UNAF U-17 Tournament under the auspices of the UNAF, which also served as a qualifiers for the Africa U-17 Cup of Nations, between 20–28 August 2018. The matches were played at Monastir (Stade Mustapha Ben Jannet) and Sousse (Stade Olympique de Sousse).

The draw for the fixtures was held on 14 May 2018. The four teams were placed in one group, with the winner qualifying for the final tournament.

All times are local, CET (UTC+1).

West A Zone
Senegal would host the WAFU-UFOA Zone A U-17 Championship between 9–18 September 2018. The matches were played at Pikine (Stade Al Djigo) and Rufisque (Stade Ngalandou Diouf).

All times are local, GMT (UTC±0).

Group stage
The draw for the group stage was held on 30 July 2018. The nine teams were drawn into three groups of three teams. The winners of each group and the best runners-up advanced to the semi-finals.

Group A

Group B

Group C

Ranking of second-placed teams

Knockout stage

Semi-finals
Winners qualified for 2019 Africa U-17 Cup of Nations.

Final

West B Zone
The WAFU-UFOA Zone B qualifiers for the Africa U-17 Cup of Nations were held in Niger between 2–15 September 2018. It was originally to be hosted at Ghana, but a new host was appointed. The matches were played at Niamey (Stade Général Seyni Kountché; Stade Municipal would originally also host matches).

All times are local, WAT (UTC+1).

Group stage
The draw for the group stage was held on 24 July 2018. The seven teams were drawn into two groups, one of three teams and one of four teams. The winners and runners-up of each group advanced to the semi-finals.

Group A

Group B

Knockout stage

Semi-finals

Third place match

Final
Winner qualified for 2019 Africa U-17 Cup of Nations.

Central Zone
The UNIFFAC qualifiers for the Africa U-17 Cup of Nations were held in Equatorial Guinea between 3–12 August 2018. It was originally to be hosted at DR Congo, but a new host was appointed. The matches were played at Bata (Estadio de Bata and Estadio La Libertad) and Malabo (Nuevo Estadio de Malabo).

All times are local, WAT (UTC+1).

Group stage
The draw for the group stage was held on 30 July 2018. The seven teams were drawn into two groups, one of four teams and one of three teams. The winners and runners-up of each group advanced to the semi-finals.

Group A

Group B

Knockout stage

Semi-finals

Third place match

Final
Winner qualified for 2019 Africa U-17 Cup of Nations.

Central-East Zone
The CECAFA qualifiers for the Africa U-17 Cup of Nations were held in Tanzania between 11–26 August 2018. The matches were played at Dar es Salaam (National Stadium and Chamazi Stadium).

All times are local, EAT (UTC+3).

Group stage
The draw for the group stage was held on 5 July 2018. The ten teams were drawn into two groups of five teams. The winners and runners-up of each group advanced to the semi-finals.

Group A

Group B

Knockout stage

Semi-finals

Third place match

Final
Winner qualified for 2019 Africa U-17 Cup of Nations.

South Zone

COSAFA announced that the COSAFA U-17 Championship hosted by Mauritius between 19–29 July 2018 would be the region's qualifying tournament. The matches were played at Port Louis (St. François Xavier Stadium) and Belle Vue Maurel (Anjalay Stadium).

All times are local, MUT (UTC+4).

Group stage
The draw for the group stage was held on 31 May 2018. The twelve teams were drawn into three groups of four teams. The winners of each group and the best runners-up advanced to the semi-finals.

Group A

Group B

Group C

Ranking of second-placed teams

Knockout stage

Semi-finals

Third place match

Final
Winner qualified for 2019 Africa U-17 Cup of Nations.

Qualified teams
The following eight teams qualify for the final tournament.

1 Bold indicates champions for that year. Italic indicates hosts for that year.

Goalscorers
North Zone: 
West A Zone: 
West B Zone: 
Central Zone: 
Central-East Zone: 
South Zone: 
In total,

Notes

References

External links
CAN U-17 Qualifiers - Zones, CAFonline.com
QUALIFIERS U17 AFCON, TANZANIA 2019 CECAFA
QUALIFIERS U17 AFCON, TANZANIA 2019 COSAFA
QUALIFIERS U17 AFCON, TANZANIA 2019 UFOA A
QUALIFIERS U17 AFCON, TANZANIA 2019 UFOA B
QUALIFIERS U17 AFCON, TANZANIA 2019 UNAF
QUALIFIERS U17 AFCON, TANZANIA 2019 UNIFFAC

U-17 Championship qualification
Africa U-17 Cup of Nations qualification
Qualification
2019
July 2018 sports events in Africa
August 2018 sports events in Africa
September 2018 sports events in Africa